Circus of Horrors is a 1960 British horror film directed by Sidney Hayers, and starring Anton Diffring, Yvonne Monlaur, Erika Remberg, Kenneth Griffith, Jane Hylton, Conrad Phillips, Yvonne Romain, and Donald Pleasence. Set in 1947, it follows a deranged plastic surgeon who changes his identity after botching an operation, and later comes to gain control of a circus that he uses as a front for his surgical exploits. The original screenplay was written by American screenwriter George Baxt.

It was released in the United States by American International Pictures as a double feature with The Angry Red Planet.

Plot
In 1947 England, plastic surgeon Dr. Rossiter is wanted by police after performing a botched operation on socialite Evelyn Morley. However, believing himself to have brilliant abilities as a surgeon, he and his assistants, Martin and Angela, evade capture and escape to France. To avoid capture, Rossiter changes his name to Dr. Schüler. Schüler sees a girl scarred in the recent war, Nicole, and befriends her father, a circus owner named Vanet. Schüler performs a surgical procedure on Nicole to restore her face, and subsequently takes over the circus after a drunken Vanet is mauled to death by a bear who is part of his act. With the assistance of Martin and Angela, Schüler begins to recruit performers, seeking out lowly and disfigured criminals whom he offers to transform with surgery should they join him. In Paris, he encounters prostitute Elissa Caro robbing and killing a man in an alleyway. Schüler offers to transform Elissa's face—which is marked by a large scar—and provide her a new identity as a performer in his circus. She reluctantly agrees.

A decade later, Schüler's circus is a prominent act throughout Europe, touted for its aesthetically beautiful performers. When its members choose to leave, however, they meet a series of mysterious accidents. One performer, Magda von Meck, informs Schüler she wants to leave. During her farewell performance in Berlin, Magda is killed during a knife-throwing act, deliberately orchestrated by Schüler. Magda's death motivates a jealous Elissa to regain  top-billing in the circus act. Later, Schüler is approached by Melina, a woman whose face has been disfigured by acid, and agrees to perform surgery on her with the intent of turning her into his new star performer. He soon falls in love with her, and intends to marry her.

Nicole, still performing in the circus, is met by Inspector Arthur Ames, posing as a journalist investigating the deaths that have occurred within the troupe. When he gains Nicole's trust, she confesses that, during her childhood, she underwent an operation from Schüler, whom she believes to be her uncle. Meanwhile, Elissa deduces that Schüler's real name is Rossiter, and attempts to blackmail him with this knowledge into restoring her top-billing in the circus. In retaliation, Schüler sets a python loose in Elissa's caravan, but she remains unwavering. Shortly after, Schüler has Elissa killed during a rope-swinging act, causing her to fall to her death.

When Schüler is mauled by one of his tigers, he instructs Angela and Martin to perform his own procedures on him. Later, Evelyn Morley, now married to Edward Finsbury, visits the circus. When she meets Schüler, whose face is half-bandaged, she faints. Angela and Martin insist they go into hiding, believing that Evelyn has recognized Schüler, but he insists the show must go on. During a lion taming act, Melina is mauled to death, traumatizing Schüler. As the guests flee in the melee, Evelyn insists to Nicole and Inspector Ames that Schüler and Rossiter are in fact the same man. Meanwhile, a deranged Schüler attacks Angela and Martin in their caravan, stabbing Angela to death. Martin eludes him, and sets a gorilla loose to attack Schüler. Police arrive, and Martin recounts the murders Schüler has committed. Meanwhile, Schüler escapes the gorilla, and attacks Inspector Ames and Nicole, before leading police on a chase through the circus grounds. He is stopped by Evelyn, who deliberately strikes him with her car. As he lay dying, Schüler's last word is "Melina."

Cast

Production

Development
After the success of Horrors of the Black Museum, Anglo-Amalgamated and AIP tried to duplicate its success with this film.

They wanted to do a horror film set in a circus. Writer George Baxt came up with the idea of a circus run by a plastic surgeon who turns criminals into beautiful people. Baxt says he had to do several drafts of the script before AIP were satisfied.

Filming
The film was shot at Beaconsfield Film Studios, with location filming on Clapham Common in London and in Old Amersham, Buckinghamshire. Billy Smart's Circus provided the big top and some of its performers appeared as extras.

Soundtrack
The score was provided between Franz Reizenstein and Muir Mathieson. Douglas Slocombe was the cinematographer.

The song "Look for a Star", written by Tony Hatch as "Mark Anthony", originated in this movie. In the United States, there were four versions issued at the same time that charted:
 Garry Mills (the original film version) (Imperial 5674) reached #26
 Garry Miles (a pseudonym used by Buzz Cason and chosen due to its similarity to Garry Mills' name)
 Deane Hawley (Dore 554) reached #29
 Billy Vaughn (the sole instrumental version) (Dot 16106) reached #19

In the UK Garry Mills recorded a studio version of the song (Top Rank JAR-336) that made No.7 in the British chart.

Release
The film opened theatrically in London on 8 April 1960.

In the United States, the film was distributed by American International Pictures as a double feature with A Bucket of Blood (1959), opening in Los Angeles in May 1960.

Box Office response
Kine Weekly called it the most popular horror film at the British box office in 1960.  The film became a surprise hit in the United States.

Home media
Anchor Bay Entertainment released Circus of Horrors on DVD in January 2002. In September 2019, Scream Factory released a Blu-ray edition of the film.

Legacy
Film critic David Pirie considered it to be the third entry in Anglo-Amalgamated's "Sadian trilogy" in his book A Heritage of Horror (1971), because the films focus on sadism, cruelty and violence (with sexual undertones) as opposed to the supernatural horror of the Hammer films in the same era. The previous films in the trilogy were Horrors of the Black Museum and Peeping Tom.

References

Sources

External links
 
 
 

1960 films
1960s crime thriller films
1960 horror films
American International Pictures films
British crime thriller films
British horror films
Circus films
Films directed by Sidney Hayers
Films set in the 1940s
Films set in the 1950s
Films set in England
Films set in France
Films set in Germany
Works about plastic surgery
1960s English-language films
1960s British films